Luke Arthur Pilling (born 25 July 1997) is a professional footballer who plays as a goalkeeper. Born in England, he has represented Wales at several youth levels.

Club career
Pilling began his career with Tranmere Rovers, joining the club at the age of six. He made his senior debut on 29 April 2017 in a 1–0 victory over Maidstone United in the National League. He spent the 2018–19 season on loan with National League North side Ashton United, making 17 league appearances.

Pilling signed a new one-year contract with Tranmere following the club's promotion to League One at the end of the 2018–19 season. Pilling made his Football League debut on 7 December 2019 as a first half substitute in place of injured starting goalkeeper Scott Davies during a 1–1 draw with Accrington Stanley.

On 4 September 2020, Pilling signed for National League side Notts County.

International career
In May 2017, Pilling was named in the Wales under-20 squad for the 2017 Toulon Tournament. After making his debut for the side in the tournament opener against Ivory Coast, Pilling played in Wales' remaining group matches against France and Bahrain as they were eliminated in the group stage. Pilling was later named Goalkeeper of the Tournament for his performances.

Personal life

Pilling is the maternal grandson of former Tranmere Rovers player Terry Stephens (footballer).

Career statistics

Honours
Individual
Toulon Tournament Best Goalkeeper: 2017

References

1997 births
Living people
People from Birkenhead
Welsh footballers
Wales youth international footballers
Wales under-21 international footballers
English footballers
English people of Welsh descent
Association football goalkeepers
Tranmere Rovers F.C. players
Ashton United F.C. players
Notts County F.C. players
English Football League players
Stafford Rangers F.C. players